Drapia (Ancient Greek) is a comune (municipality) in the Province of Vibo Valentia in the Italian region Calabria, located about  southwest of Catanzaro and about  west of Vibo Valentia.

The municipality of Drapia contains the frazioni (subdivisions, mainly villages and hamlets) Brattirò, Carìa, Gàsponi, and Sant'Angelo.

Drapia borders the following municipalities: Parghelia, Ricadi, Spilinga, Tropea, Zaccanopoli, Zungri.

Demographic evolution

References

Cities and towns in Calabria